Weobley was a parliamentary borough in Herefordshire, which elected two Members of Parliament (MPs) to the House of Commons in 1295 and from 1628 until 1832, when the borough was abolished by the Great Reform Act.

Members of Parliament

MPs 1628–1660

MPs 1660–1832

Notes

References 
Robert Beatson, A Chronological Register of Both Houses of Parliament (London: Longman, Hurst, Res & Orme, 1807) 
 J Holladay Philbin, Parliamentary Representation 1832 - England and Wales (New Haven: Yale University Press, 1965)
 

Parliamentary constituencies in Herefordshire (historic)
Constituencies of the Parliament of the United Kingdom disestablished in 1832
Rotten boroughs
Constituencies of the Parliament of the United Kingdom established in 1295
Constituencies of the Parliament of the United Kingdom established in 1628